The Landmaster is a unique military vehicle featured in the 1977 film Damnation Alley.

Landmaster may also refer to:
 Landmaster (Star Fox), a fictional tank from the Star Fox series of video games
 Landmaster 9.12, a Leyland Trucks model from the early 1980s
 Land Master, a late 1970s British 4×4 truck
 Landmaster (cultivator), a brand of wheeled, small engine powered rotary tiller machine